Plerandra elegantissima (formerly called Schefflera elegantissima and Dizygotheca elegantissima), the  false aralia, is a species of flowering plant in the family Araliaceae, native to New Caledonia.

Description
Its leaves are thin, coppery red to dark green with toothed edges and consist of 7-11 leaflets. On adult plants the leaves are much broader. In autumn it bears clusters of pale green flowers followed by black fruit.

Cultivation
In cultivation, it needs a lot of light and humidity. The soil should dry out between watering. This plant has little branching and is sensitive to the appearance of mealybugs.

Under the name Schefflera elegantissima, this plant has gained the Royal Horticultural Society's Award of Garden Merit.

References

elegantissima
Flora of New Caledonia
Trees of the Pacific
Ornamental trees